Lauren Holtkamp (born November 24, 1980) is a professional basketball referee in the National Basketball Association (NBA), wearing number 7. Holtkamp became the third woman to be a full-time NBA referee. Holtkamp also played college basketball at Drury University from 2000 to 2004. Holtkamp previously refereed the last five NBA Development League seasons before becoming a full-time referee for the 2014–15 NBA season. Holtkamp officiated four seasons in the WNBA including the WNBA 2014 conference finals. Holtkamp graduated from Emory University with a Master of Divinity.  She also graduated from Drury University with both a Master of Arts in Communication and a Bachelor of Arts in Business Administration. In June 2017, Holtkamp married NBA referee Jonathan Sterling. In 2019, Holtkamp gave birth to their daughter.

Drury statistics 

Source

References

External links
National Basketball Referees Association bio

1980 births
Living people
Basketball players from Missouri
Drury Panthers women's basketball players
Drury University alumni
Emory University alumni
National Basketball Association referees
Sportspeople from Jefferson City, Missouri
Women basketball referees
NBA G League referees
American women referees and umpires